The Diocese of Central Solomons is one of the nine current dioceses of the Anglican Church of Melanesia.

The diocese was inaugurated on 4 May 1997, erected from part of the Diocese of Central Melanesia. The cathedral was and remains Christ the King Cathedral, Tulagi. The Central Solomons diocese was divided on 23 June 2013, in order to erect the new Diocese of Guadalcanal by decision of the Anglican Church of Melanesia General Synod; Rennell and Bellona moved to the new diocese while the Nggela and Savo remained. Following that division, the population covered by the Diocese of Central Solomons was around to 17,700.

List of bishops

References

Sources
Anglican Church of Melanesia — Diocese of Central Solomons

 
Central Solomons, Diocese of
Melanesia
Christian organizations established in 1997
1997 establishments in Oceania